The General Directorate for National Security Commonly referred to by its acronym (DGSN), is the national police force of the Kingdom of Morocco. The DGSN is tasked with upholding the law and public order.
It was founded on 16 May 1956 by King Mohammed V. It works alongside the Gendarmerie Royale and the Forces Auxiliaires.

In 2007, the Sûreté Nationale had approximately 46,000 personnel. A decade later, in 2017, the number of personnel increased to 70,000.

As of 2004, the Sûreté Nationale operated the following specialist divisions:
 The Border Police: responsible for border control and surveillance
 Mobile Intervention Corps: tasked with rapid intervention in major emergencies
 National Brigade: primarily responsible for investigation on serious crimes including terrorism, organized and white-collar crime.

History 
Before colonialism, the Shurta (police) enforced Sharia law and ensured security across the country. During the Almohad caliphate, the caliph took on the role of ṣāḥib al-shurṭa (head of police). There were regional and tribal Muhtasibs (equivalent to a police commissioner) who were appointed by the Pasha. The Muhtasib had the power to issue fines for minor offenses. Criminals were tried in front of a Qadi, the judge of a Sharia court. The Qadi issued judgements in criminal, civil and commercial cases.

In 1912, the Shurta was replaced by the Protectorate's Police Service after the installement of the French Protectorate in Morocco. In 1913, a forensic identification unit was formed. A general forensic identification service was formed in November 1931.

On May 16, 1956, a year after Morocco gained independence, the DGSN was formed. The Royal Institute of Police in Kenitra was inaugurated in 1978. The Scientific and Technical Police Laboratory in Casablanca was created in 1991.

References

See also
 Groupes urbains de sécurité

Law enforcement agencies of Morocco